Siobhán Cleary (born 10 May 1970) is an Irish composer. Her most successful compositions have been her orchestral works Alchemy and Cokaygne and her choral piece Theophilus Thistle and the Myth of Miss Muffett. Her opera Vampirella was first performed in Dublin in March 2017. She is a member of Aosdána.

Early life and education
Born in Dublin, Cleary started to compose from an early age, often writing pieces while she was supposed to be practising at the piano. When she began to study music at Maynooth University, she was initially inspired by Luciano Berio's Sinfonia, and soon afterwards by the works of the Irish composer Gerald Barry, the French Olivier Messiaen and the Hungarian György Ligeti. She continued her studies at Queen's University Belfast and Trinity College, Dublin. In addition, she has followed courses in composition with the Italian composer Franco Donatoni and the Dutch Louis Andriessen and received private tuition from the American Tom Johnson and the South African Kevin Volans. With the Italian composer Ennio Morricone and the American Don Brandon Ray, she has also studied film scoring.

Composition
Inspired by the alchemists' Opus Alchymicum which describes how cheaper metals are transmuted into gold, Cleary's orchestral work Alchemy (2001) is, like the stages in the Opus, presented in four parts: it evolves from the slow nigrendo, the moderate albedo, the strong citronatus, and the burning rubedo. The work was performed by the RTÉ National Symphony Orchestra in January 2002.

Her tone poem Cokaygne (2009), which, like Alchemy, was commissioned by RTÉ for the National Symphony Orchestra, is based on a poem and old sources which evoke a land of extreme luxury and contentment. The elaborately orchestrated piece was performed by the RTÉ National Symphony Orchestra in November 2009, Vladimir Altschuler conducting. It was performed by the RTÉNSO once again in June 2016, this time under the baton of Alan Buribayev.

Cleary's choral work Theophilus Thistle and the Myth of Miss Muffett (2010), commissioned by the Cork Choral Festival was first performed in April 2011 by Chamber Choir Ireland directed by Paul Hillier. The work is based on a series of tongue twisters and other strange combinations of words popular in various European languages and dialects, moving from Italy, through Germany and Spain, finishing in Ireland. In 2013, it was performed twice by Chamber Choir Ireland in Dublin and Cork in connection with Ireland's presidency of the European Union. The journalist and music critic Terry Blain commented on the choir's "dazzingly virtuosic performance" in Belfast in 2013, qualifying the piece as "a tour de force of 21st century vocal chicanery, a clever and richly entertaining composition". Theophilus Thistle was also performed the same year in the United States as part of the "Imagine Ireland" festival.

The chamber opera Vampirella with a libretto by Katy Hayes was first performed by students from the Royal Irish Academy of Music and the Lir National Academy of Dramatic Art at Dublin's Smock Alley Theatre in March 2017. Based on a short story by Angela Carter telling how a young English soldier is seduced by a vampire countess, it was directed by Conor Hanratty and conducted by Andrew Synnott. Michael Dervan of The Irish Times found the electronic sounds in the score particularly effective, commenting: "Perhaps this is a case of a genuinely electronic opera trying to break out of a more conventional mold."

Awards
In 1996, Cleary received a young artists award from Pépinières européennes pour jeunes artistes, followed in 1997 by the first prize in the Arklow Music Festival Composers' Competition. In 2008, she was invited to become a member of Aosdána, an Irish association of creative artists.

References

External links
Siobhán Cleary's website

1970 births
21st-century classical composers
21st-century women composers
Alumni of Maynooth University
Alumni of Queen's University Belfast
Alumni of Trinity College Dublin
Aosdána members
Electroacoustic music composers
Women classical composers
Women film score composers
Women opera composers
Irish women classical composers
Irish film score composers
Irish opera composers
Living people
Musicians from Dublin (city)